Gondwanenneboeus is a genus in the beetle family, Archeocrypticidae, first described in 1984 by Zoltán Kaszab. There is just one species in the genus, Gondwanenneboeus minutissimus. The genus is named for Gondwana Land, and is native to Australia.

References

Tenebrionoidea
Taxa named by Zoltán Kaszab
Taxa described in 1984
Monotypic beetle genera